The King of Arms of the Order of St Michael and St George is the herald of the Order of St Michael and St George.

Kings of Arms

References
Galloway, Peter The Order of St Michael and St George (London, Third Millennium Publishing, 2000) pp 362-3.

Order of St Michael and St George
Order of St Michael and St George